Qalehcheh (also Romanized as Qal‘ehcheh and Qal‘eh Cheh; also known as Ghal’eh Cheh and Kalacha) is a village in Lahijan Rural District, Khosrowshahr District, Tabriz County, East Azerbaijan Province, Iran. At the 2006 census, its population was 186, in 55 families.

References 

Populated places in Tabriz County